The Tanks That Broke the Ranks Out in Picardy (also known by the shorter title of The Tanks That Broke the Ranks) is a 1916 song written jointly by Harry Castling and Harry Carlton.

Overview 
The song celebrated the introduction of the tank which was first used by the British in 1916 as part of the Battle of the Somme.

The song tells the story of a brigade of tanks on the Western Front, passing obstacles with ease. It references many prominent German military leaders of the day, including Kaiser Wilhelm, Alfred von Tirpitz, Paul von Hindenburg and Prince Wilhelm.  It is written to the jaunty tune of a music hall hit of a few years earlier, "The Man Who Broke the Bank at Monte Carlo".

The song was popular during Christmas pantomime performances at the end of 1916.

References

External links
1916 recording of the song

1916 songs
British songs
Songs of World War I
Songs about France
Songs about Wilhelm II